James Handy is an American film actor. He appeared in numerous films and television shows since 1977. On film, he appeared in as Byers in K-9 and in Logan.  His most notable television appearances are as Arthur Devlin in Alias and Lou Handleman in Profiler.

Acting career
Handy is known for his multiple guest star roles in television shows and his work in some highly popular films. Among his feature film credits are 15 minutes, Jumanji, Guarding Tess, The Rocketeer, Arachnophobia, Bird, Burglar, Brighton Beach Memoirs, The Verdict and K-9. Made for television movies in which he has appeared include A Family Torn Apart, Obsessed, Guilty Until Proven Innocent, and The Preppie Murder.

On television, in episodic and comedy series, he appeared on The Young and the Restless, Criminal Minds, nine episodes of Alias, Cold Case, The West Wing, UC: Undercover, Third Watch, ER, Law & Order, The Pretender, Quantum Leap, and Castle. He appeared in ten episodes of NYPD Blue as Captain Haverhill.

In 2017, he appeared in Logan as the old doctor who treated Hugh Jackman after his first fight with X-24.

Filmography

References

External links
 

Living people
American male film actors
American male television actors
Male actors from New York City
Year of birth missing (living people)